Pasteurella testudinis is a Gram-negative, nonmotile, rod-shaped species of bacteria of the family Pasteurellaceae. Strains of this species were isolated from desert tortoises (Gopherus agassizi).

P. testudinis may be pathogenic in tortoises.

References

External links
Type strain of Pasteurella testudinis at BacDive -  the Bacterial Diversity Metadatabase

Pasteurellales
Bacteria described in 1982